Orta Əlinəzərli is a village and municipality in the Beylagan Rayon of Azerbaijan. It has a population of 1,060.

References

Populated places in Beylagan District